Lothrop Withington (January 31, 1856 – May 7, 1915) was a well-known American genealogist, historian, and book editor who was killed in the sinking of the RMS Lusitania.

Born in Newburyport, Massachusetts to Nathan Noyes Withington (1828–1914) and Elizabeth (Little) Withington (1828–1912), he was involved with research and editing of publications on certain aspects of the American Revolutionary War but best known was his extensive genealogical research that included the publication of immigrant ships' passenger lists and the like.

On October 14, 1892, in London, he married Caroline Augusta Lloyd, a sister of Henry Demarest Lloyd. They had no children.

In 1915, Withington was involved with research in Canterbury, Kent in England where he had discovered in the strong room of the Probate Registry a list of wills covering the period 1640/ 50. He is said to have been the only person aside from the officials of the Registry aware of the existence of these documents. Sensitive to their great value, he decided to make a 'Calendar' of the Wills. Lothrop Withington had not dealt with more than half of the papers when he had to make a voyage home to the United States.

In May 1915, he was returning to his work in the United Kingdom but lost his life on board the  when it was attacked and sunk by German U-boat .

He had no children at the time of his death.  His grandnephew (a brother's grandson) was Lothrop Withington Jr., the progenitor of goldfish swallowing.

External links
 The Lusitania Resource - Mr. Lothrop Withington
  - Blog entry regarding Lothrop Withington and his connection with the New England Historic Genealogical Society, Boston, Massachusetts

American genealogists
American book editors
Deaths on the RMS Lusitania
Writers from Newburyport, Massachusetts
1856 births
1915 deaths
Historians from Massachusetts